The genus Callophrys consists of butterflies in the family Lycaenidae. It is apparently not monophyletic, but which of the taxa currently considered junior synonyms of Callophrys are valid genera remains to be determined.

The Asian and European members of this genus and some North American species are commonly known as green hairstreaks, and the North American species in the subgenus Incisalia are called elfins.

Species
Listed alphabetically within groups.

Subgenus Callophrys Billberg, 1820:
 Callophrys affinis (W. H. Edwards, 1862) – western green hairstreak, immaculate green hairstreak
 Callophrys amphichloros (Cabeau, 1923)
 Callophrys androflavus (Capuse, 1963)
 Callophrys armeniaca Zhdanko, 1998
 Callophrys apama (W. H. Edwards, 1882) – canyon green hairstreak
 Callophrys avis Chapman, 1909 – Chapman's green hairstreak
 Callophrys barraguei (Dujardin, 1972)
 Callophrys bipunctata (Tutt, 1907)
 Callophrys borelis (Krulikovski, 1890)
 Callophrys brunnea (Tutt, 1907)
 Callophrys butlerovi (Migranov, 1992)
 Callophrys caecus (Fourcroy, 1785)
 Callophrys caerulescens (Bang-Haas, 1912)
 Callophrys chalybeitincta Sovinsky, 1905
 Callophrys cinerascens (Rebel, 1909)
 Callophrys comstocki (Henne, 1941)
 Callophrys connexa (Tutt, 1907)
 Callophrys davisi (Watson & Comstock, 1920)
 Callophrys danchenkoi Zhdanko, 1998
 Callophrys dumetorum (Boisduval, 1852) – bramble hairstreak, coastal green hairstreak, bluish green hairstreak
 Callophrys fervida (Staudinger, 1901)
 Callophrys foulquieri (Rivertigat, 1915)
 Callophrys gryneus (Hübner, [1819]) – juniper hairstreak
 Callophrys hatuma Zhdanko, 1996
 Callophrys herculeana (Pfeiffer, 1927)
 Callophrys homoperplexa (Barnes & Benjamin, 1923)
 Callophrys mcfarlandi (Clench & Ehrlich, 1960) – Sandia hairstreak
 Callophrys mystaphia Miller, 1913 – rhubarb hairstreak
 Callophrys paulae Pfeiffer, 1932
 Callophrys perplexa Barnes & Benjamin, 1923
 Callophrys rubi (Linnaeus, 1758) – green hairstreak
 Callophrys sheridanii (W. H. Edwards, 1877) – Sheridan's hairstreak, white-lined green hairstreak
 Callophrys suaveola (Staudinger, 1881)
 Callophrys titanus Zhdanko, 1998
 Callophrys washingtonia (Clench, 1945)

Subgenus Cisincisalia Johnson, 1992:
 Callophrys johnsoni (Skinner, 1904) – Johnson's hairstreak
 Callophrys spinetorum (Hewitson, 1867) – thicket hairstreak
 Callophrys guatemalena Clench, 1981

Subgenus Incisalia Scudder, 1872:
 Callophrys augustinus (Westwood, 1852) – brown elfin
 Callophrys eryphon (Boisduval, 1852) – western pine elfin
 Callophrys fotis (Strecker, 1878) – early elfin
 Callophrys henrici (Grote & Robinson, 1867) – Henry's elfin
 Callophrys irus (Godart, 1824) – frosted elfin
 Callophrys lanoraieensis Sheppard, 1934 – bog elfin
 Callophrys mossii (H. Edwards, 1881) – Moss's elfin, stonecrop elfin, Schryver's elfin
 Callophrys niphon (Hübner, 1819) – eastern pine elfin
 Callophrys polios Cook & Watson, 1907 – hoary elfin

Subgenus Mitoura Scudder, 1872:
 Callophrys barryi (K. Johnson, 1976) – Barry's hairstreak
 Callophrys gryneus (Hübner, 1819) – olive hairstreak, juniper hairstreak
 Callophrys hesseli (Rawson & Ziegler, 1950) – Hessel's hairstreak
 Callophrys muiri (H. Edwards, 1881) – Muir's hairstreak
 Callophrys rosneri (Johnson, 1976) – Rosner's hairstreak, cedar hairstreak
 Callophrys thornei (Brown, 1983) – Thorne's hairstreak

Subgenus Sandia Clench & Ehrlich, 1960:
 Callophrys mcfarlandi Ehrlich & Clench, 1960 – Sandia hairstreak

Subgenus Xamia Clench, 1961:
 Callophrys xami (Reakirt, 1867) – xami hairstreak (southern Arizona and Texas south to Guatemala)
 Callophrys scaphia Clench, 1981

Subgenus Ahlbergia Bryk, 1946 
 Callophrys aleucopuncta K. Johnson, 1992
 Callophrys arquata K. Johnson, 1992
 Callophrys bimaculata K. Johnson, 1992
 Callophrys caerulea K. Johnson, 1992
 Callophrys caesius K. Johnson, 1992
 Callophrys chalcidis I. Chou & H.H. Li, 1994
 Callophrys chalybeia (Leech, 1890)
 Callophrys circe (Leech, 1893)
 Callophrys clarofacia (K. Johnson, 1992)
 Callophrys clarolinea (H. Huang & A.M. Chen, 2006)
 Callophrys confusa (H. Huang, Z. Chen & M. Li, 2006)
 Callophrys distincta H. Huang, 2003
 Callophrys dongyui (H. Huang & C.H. Zhan, 2006)
 Callophrys ferrea (Butler, 1866)
 Callophrys frivaldszkyi (Lederer, 1855)
 Callophrys haradai (Igarashi, 1973)
 Callophrys hsui (K. Johnson, 2000)
 Callophrys huertasblancae (K. Yoshino, 2016)
 Callophrys korea K. Johnson, 1992
 Callophrys leechii (de Nicéville, [1893])
 Callophrys leechuanlungi (H. Huang & Y.C. Chen, 2005)
 Callophrys leei (K. Johnson, 1992)
 Callophrys luoliangi (H. Huang & K. Song, 2006)
 Callophrys lynda (K. Johnson, 1992)
 Callophrys nicevillei (Leech, 1893)
 Callophrys pictila K. Johnson, 1992
 Callophrys pluto (Leech, 1893)
 Callophrys prodiga K. Johnson, 1992
 Callophrys unicolora K. Johnson, 1992
 Callophrys zhujianhuai H. Huang & C.S. Wu, 2003

Unnamed genus:
 Callophrys dospassosi Clench, 1981
 Callophrys estela Clench, 1981

References

External links
images representing Callophrys  at Consortium for the Barcode of Life
mages representing Ahlbergia  at Consortium for the Barcode of Life
Callophrys "Le genre Callophrys" from French Wikipedia provides more distribution information

 
Eumaeini
Lycaenidae of South America
Lycaenidae genera
Taxa named by Gustaf Johan Billberg